The Wreaking is the third EP by Canadian grindcore band Fuck the Facts. The EP was released on November 29, 2008 via the band's MySpace page and was strictly limited to 19 copies. When the 7" vinyl copies of the split with Pleasant Valley were sold out, there were still some copies of the sleeve, so the band created this EP.

It comprises songs from a few different sources. The first two tracks are pre-production versions of songs found on Stigmata High-Five. They were originally released on vinyl splits with Mesrine and Pleasant Valley. The other songs are live songs originally intended to be released on a split with Mincing Fury on Burning Dogma Records, however, the owner of the label went to jail before it could be released.

"Taken From The Nest" and "The Wreaking" were recorded in Ottawa by Matt Connell in October and November 2005 respectively. The live tracks were recorded at a show on November 13, 2005 at Maverick's in Ottawa with Exhumed, Averse Sefira and Eclipse Eternal.

Track listing
Music and lyrics by Fuck the Facts.
"Taken from the Nest"
"The Wreaking"
"Horizon" (live)
"The Burning Side" (live)
"23-17-41" (live)
"La Tete Hors de L’eau" (live)
"Unburden" (live)

Personnel
Topon Das – guitar
Mel Mongeon – vocals
Mathieu Vilandré – guitar
Steve Chartier – bass
Tim Olsen – drums
Matt Connell – recording

References

2008 EPs
Fuck the Facts albums
Self-released EPs